Abdul-Hafeedh Arbeesh (born July 23, 1963, in Tripoli) is a Libyan professional football player and manager. He plays as a defender for Al-Madina S.C. In 1998, he began his coaching career. He was a coach of the clubs Al-Madina S.C., Wefaq Sabratha, Al-Shat S.C., Al Urouba (Ajelat), Khaleej Sirte S.C., Al-Hilal SC (Benghazi) and Darnes S.C. Since March 2012 until September 2013 he coaches the Libya national football team.

Managerial statistics

References

External links

Profile at Soccerpunter.com

1963 births
Living people
Libyan footballers
Al-Madina SC players
Libyan football managers
Libya national football team managers
Association football defenders
People from Tripoli, Libya
Libyan Premier League players
Al-Hilal SC (Benghazi) managers